Domitius Modestus (floruit 358–377) was a politician of the Roman Empire.  He held appointments under the emperors Constantius II, Julian, and Valens, and was consul in 372.  Previously a pagan, he converted to Arianism under Valens, and was sent by Valens to mediate between the Arian and Nicene factions with Basil of Caesarea.

Life 

Of Arab origin, Modestus was comes Orientis from 358 to 362, succeeding to Nebridius and serving under the Emperors Constantius II and Julian. In 359 he was the president of a commission at Scythopolis, and in this office he judged with cruelty the defendants.

While he was in Antioch, Julian appointed Modestus as praefectus urbi of Constantinople, an office he held from 362 to 363.

Under Emperor Valens he was Praetorian prefect of the East (369-377) and consul in 372. During his office as Praetorian prefect he completed the building of the Cisterna Modestiaca (a cistern identified with Sarrâdshchane), whose building was begun by the architect Helpidius in 363, while Modestus was praefectus urbi.

In 371 was appointed president of a commission that was to judge some high officers who had been accused of practicing magic, in particular of having consulted a soothsayer to learn the name of the successor of Emperor Valens. Modestus acted very cruelly, torturing innocent people, thus extorting confessions from them. His consulate, the following year, was probably a reward for his handling of the process.

Despite the fact that he was strongly connected with the pagan officers and had been a pagan under the pagan Emperor Julian, under Valens he converted to Arianism, the Emperor's religion. Valens sent Modestus to meet the Nicene bishop Basil of Caesarea, to mediate between the two opposing Christian faiths, but Basil refused. Modestus was then ordered by Valens to use violence against the bishop, but he did not.

He is the addressee of 37 letters by Libanius.

References

Sources 
 Burns, Paul (ed.), Butler's Lives of the Saints: New Full Edition January. The Liturgical Press. .
 Jones, Arnold Hugh Martin, John Robert Martindale, John Morris, Prosopography of the Later Roman Empire, volume 1, Cambridge University Press, 1992, pp. 605-08

4th-century Arabs
4th-century Romans
4th-century Arian Christians
4th-century Roman consuls
Arab Christians
Arabs in the Roman Empire
Arian Christians
Comites Orientis
Correspondents of Libanius
Modestus
Imperial Roman consuls
Praetorian prefects of the East
Urban prefects of Constantinople